In video gaming, Pac-Man clones are unauthorized versions of Namco's popular maze chase arcade game Pac-Man or games that wholesale borrow the design of Pac-Man. The combined sales of counterfeit arcade machines sold nearly as many units as the original Pac-Man, which had sold more than 300,000 machines.

Like the original game, Pac-Man clones typically have the goal of clearing a maze of dots while eluding deadly adversaries. When special dots are eaten, the protagonist can chase and consume the pursuers for a brief period. Clones may vary the audio/visual theme, use different maze layouts, slightly tweak features, or even invert elements such as filling the maze rather than emptying it, but they have the same general feel of Pac-Man.

The Giant List of Classic Game Programmers lists 57 Pac-Man clones released for various platforms.

Arcade clonesLock 'n' Chase was developed and published by Data East in Japan in 1981, and was later published in North America by Taito. Here, Pac-Man was replaced with a thief stealing coins from a bank vault. The ghosts were replaced with police, and the thief could temporarily block passages with doors. The game was later licensed to Mattel, which produced the Intellivision and Atari 2600 home console versions in 1982. 

Mighty Mouth is a game by A-1 Machines that District Court Judge Warren Keith Urbom described as "for all practical purposes, identical to ...Pac-Man"  Among the similarities cited were the color and shape of the player character and ghosts, the maze configurations, the sound effects, the paths of the characters in the attract mode and the paths of the characters in both the attract mode and a game where the player does not move.  Midway, owners of the Pac-Man copyrights, were granted summary judgment for copyright and trademark infringement in 1983.

Piranha was released by GL in 1981.  The central character is a dot-chomping piranha, and squid creatures replace the ghost monsters.

The Hand was released by TIC in 1981.  The central character is a dot-chomping hand, and the ghost monsters are replaced by hands representing Rock (a fist), Paper (splayed fingers), and Scissors (two fingers outstretched).

Thief was released by Pacific Novelty in 1981. The central character is the titular Thief in a getaway vehicle, while police officers in cars replace the ghost monsters. Thief is notable for using approximately eight minutes of scripted radio communications between the officers, played from a cassette tape inside the game cabinet.

Contemporary home system clones

Taxman is a 1981 Pac-Man clone for the Apple II programmed by Brian Fitzgerald. Atari sued Fitzgerald and he sold the port to Atari, which the company ended up selling as a licensed version of the game.

Ghost Hunter from Arcade Plus is a 1981 clone for the Atari 8-bit family that plays The Twilight Zone theme at the start of the game.

Jawbreaker (1981) for the Atari 8-bit family re-themed the gameplay, winning a best action game award in 1983. Atari threatened to sue the publishers, Sierra On-Line, but they released the game anyway. They won the ensuing lawsuit.

K.C. Munchkin! is a 1981 release in the official line of games for the Magnavox Odyssey². It  is very heavily based on Namco's 1980 arcade game Pac-Man, but not a direct clone. It was however, similar enough for Atari to sue Philips and force them to cease production of Munchkin. In the 1982 case Atari, Inc. v. North American Philips Consumer Electronics Corp., an Appellate court found that Phillips had copied Pac-Man and made alterations that "only tend to emphasize the extent to which it deliberately copied the Plaintiff's work." The ruling was one of the first to establish how copyright law would apply to the look and feel of computer software.

Scarfman is a 1981 Pac-Man clone for the monochrome TRS-80 computers.

Gobble a Ghost (1982, CDS Micro Systems) for the 16K ZX Spectrum.

Hungry Horace is a 1982 Pac-Man clone for the ZX Spectrum. 

Munch Man is a 1982 clone from Texas Instruments for the TI-99/4A home computer. Instead of clearing a maze, the player fills it with "links" (in Munch Man parlance)—a change made by TI to avoid possible lawsuits.

Snack Attack is a 1982 clone for the Apple II written by Dan Illowsky and published by Datamost. It became a top selling game for the Apple II.

Snapper initial release for the BBC Micro and Acorn Electron,  by Acornsoft in 1982, was so close to Pac-Man (including the design of the game's characters) that this version had to be withdrawn and re-released with the characters changed. The player's character became a round yellow face with very short legs wearing a green cowboy hat and the ghosts became skinny humanoid monsters.

CatChum is a text-only Pac-Man clone for Kaypro's early line of luggable home computers. It was created by Yahoo Software and released in 1982 and 1983. Because the early Kaypros did not have graphics capability, this clone used dashes and various punctuation marks to construct a maze. The letter A served as ghosts and the fruits were replaced by dollar signs. The Pac-man was a letter C which went from upper to lower case, intermittently, to simulate a chomping Pac-man. A major down side of the game was that early Kaypros were not able to flip text characters. As a result, the CatChum Pac-Man was always facing right, even when chomping pills on its left.

3-Demon is a 3D vector-graphics Pac-Man clone developed by PC Research in 1983 for MS-DOS. As opposed to using a single screen maze, the game is placed in a 3D first-person perspective, with the ghosts being cyclopean demons.

Jelly Monsters for the VIC-20 is a faithful port of Namco's Pac-Man by HAL Laboratory who had the home computer rights to Namco's games in Japan at the time, but when the games were released in North America, the names were changed to avoid legal issues with Atari, Inc. who had the home computer rights in North America to Jelly Monsters for the VIC-20 which was published by Commodore International. Atari ended up suing HAL and Commodore anyway and won the lawsuit, after which Atari pulled off HAL's VIC-20 port and released their own version, after the lawsuit HAL sold the Japanese home computer rights to Dempa who ended up porting the game to many home computers in Japan. this excluded the MSX version of the game of which Namco ported themselves under their Namcot branding.

Devil World for the Famicom is a 1984 Pac-Man clone designed by Shigeru Miyamoto

Mini and mainframe clones

Pac-Man is a clone for the Xerox Alto, the first computer that used a mouse-driven Graphical User Interface. The gameplay is slightly unusual as the Pac-Man character is controlled with a mouse.

PAC is a clone for the CDC 6000 series of mainframe computers.

See also
 List of maze chase games

References

 
Pac-Man
Pac-Man clones
Pac-Man clones